The Traditionalist Communion (CT) was one of the names adopted by the Carlist movement as a political force since 1869.

History 
In October 1931, Carlist claimant to the Spanish throne Duke Jaime died. He was succeeded by the 82-year-old claimant Alfonso Carlos de Borbón, reuniting under him the integrists led by Olazábal and the "Mellists". They represented a region-based Spanish nationalism with an entrenched identification of Spain and Catholicism. The ensuing radicalized Carlist scene overshadowed the "Jaimists" with a Basque inclination. The Basque(-Navarrese) Statute failed to take off over disagreements on the centrality of Catholicism in 1932, with the new Carlist party Comunión Tradicionalista opting for an open confrontation with the Republic. The Republic established a secular approach of the regime, a division of Church and state, as well as freedom of cults, as France did in 1905, an approach traditionalists could not stand.

The Comunión Tradicionalista (1932) showed an ultra-Catholic, anti-secular position, and plotted for a military takeover, while adopting far-right apocalyptic views and talking of a final clash with an alliance of alleged anti-Christian forces. 

The October 1934 Revolution cost the life of the Carlist deputy Marcelino Oreja Elósegui, with Manuel Fal Condé taking over from young Carlists clustering around the AET (Jaime del Burgo and Mario Ozcoidi) in their pursuit to overthrow the Republic. The Carlists started to prepare for an armed definite clash with the Republic and its different leftist groups. From the initial defensive Decurias of Navarre (deployed in party seats and churches), the Requeté grew into a well-trained and strongest offensive paramilitary group in Spain when Manuel Fal Condé took the reins. It numbered 30,000 red berets (8,000 in Navarre and 22,000 in Andalusia).

When the Spanish Civil War broke out in 1936 following the election of a coalition of socialist, communist, and anarchist parties, the Traditionalist Communion sided with the Spanish Nationalists, despite ideological differences with the Falangists, out of shared Catholicism and repression under the Republic. Seeking to unify all Nationalist Forces, the General Francisco Franco announced that all political parties, other than FET y de las JONS, were dissolved, and the Traditionalist Communion ceased to exist. Carlism remained a scattered movement until the end of the dictatorship and creation of the Carlist Party of Euskal Herria, but never regained its pre-war might.

Ideology 

Carlism is a reactionary, monarchist, and extremely Catholic ideology. It developed after the King Ferdinand VII changed the succession laws, meaning Don Carlos would no longer become the next king. Its main tenets are "God, Country, and King", and it spawned many other political parties, the most notable of which was the Carlist Party of Euskal Herria, which was formed as an underground party during the fascist government and went on to run in the elections following the democratization of Spain.

References

1869 establishments in Spain
1937 disestablishments in Spain
Carlism
Catholic political parties
Conservative parties in Spain
Defunct conservative parties
Defunct political parties in Spain
Monarchist parties in Spain
Political parties established in 1869
Political parties disestablished in 1937
Political parties of the Spanish Civil War